Basulto is a surname. Notable people with the surname include:

Diego Hernández Basulto (born 1993), Mexican footballer
José Basulto (born 1940), Cuban exile and civic leader
Miguel Basulto (born 1992), Mexican footballer